Kottarakara railway station (Code: KKZ) is a railway station in the Indian town of Kottarakkara in Kollam district, Kerala. Kottarakara railway station falls under the Madurai railway division of the Southern Railway zone of Indian Railways. It is a 'D-Class'(NSG 6) Adersh station. Indian railway is connecting Kottarakkara with various cities in India like Kollam, Thiruvananthapuram, Ernakulam, Thrissur, Palakkad, Kottayam,  Madurai, Trichy, Chennai, Tenkasi,  Tirunelveli, Nagercoil & with various towns like Punalur, Paravur, Kayamkulam, Thiruvalla, Changanacherry, Aluva, Guruvayoor, Punalur, Sengottai, Rajapalayam, Virudunagar, Mavelikkara, Chengannur, Aluva, Karunagappalli, Varkala, Kazhakkoottam, Neyyattinkara, Kanyakumari & Valliyur.

Services

See also

 Kollam Junction railway station
 Karunagappalli railway station
 Paravur railway station
 Punalur railway station
 Kundara railway station

References

Kottarakara
Thiruvananthapuram railway division
1904 establishments in India
Railway stations opened in 1904